Float shifting or floating gears, also called "slip shifting", "dead sticking" or "bang shifting", is the process of changing gears, in typically a non-synchronous transmission, without depressing the clutch.  Shifting in this manner is also used with synchronous manual transmissions, particularly after a clutch failure, to prevent destroying the syncromeshes with the power of the engine. 

The most skillful drivers can shift non-synchronous transmissions without using the clutch by bringing the engine to exactly the right RPM in neutral before attempting to complete a shift. If done improperly, it can damage or destroy a transmission. Some truck drivers use this technique with the higher gears. The technique is sometimes also used on motorcycles, but has largely been replaced by quickshifters for competitive use.

Technique 
To upshift, the driver should first bring the engine up to speed. They must then shift to neutral and apply moderate pressure to the gear stick, and when the RPMs are low enough, the shifter will slide into place. The same technique for shifting down is used except that the accelerator must have some pressure applied to it to bring the RPMs up to match the speed of that gear at that wheel speed.

Pros and cons 
Float shifting can reduce clutch and synchromesh wear because they are simply not used in the process of selecting a gear. Conversely, improper engagement of a gear (when the engine and transmission speeds aren't matched) can cause damage to the gears by physically grinding them together due to a difference in speed.  Float shifting takes longer due to the engine RPM needing to decrease.

References

Driving techniques